BTM may refer to:

Businesses and organizations
British Tabulating Machine Company, former data-processing equipment company
British Talent Management, a record label founded by Miles Copeland III
Business Technology Management, a discipline in Business Administration

Chemistry
Bis-tris methane, a buffering agent used in biochemistry
Bromotrifluoromethane, a chemical used for fire suppression and refrigeration
RCS-4 or BTM-4, a synthetic cannabinoid
RCS-8 or BTM-8, a synthetic cannabinoid

Computers and mathematics
Biot–Tolstoy–Medwin diffraction model, in mathematics, describes edge diffraction
.btm, a batch file extension

Entertainment
Behind the Music and BTM2, a documentary television series on VH1
Betraying the Martyrs (BtM), a French extreme metal band
Blocks That Matter, 2011 computer game
 Before the Mourning, a former American heavy metal musical ensemble

Transportation
Bert Mooney Airport (IATA code), near Butte, Montana, USA
Bristol Temple Meads railway station, Bristol, England

Other uses
Benefitive treasury measure, a cost-benefit analysis of immigration on a macroeconomic scale
Bronx Terminal Market, a shopping mall in Concourse, Bronx, New York
BTM Antananarivo, a Malagasy football club in Antananarivo, Madagascar
BTM Layout, a residential area in southern Bangalore, India
BTM-1, a variant of the Martin AM Mauler, a United States Navy aircraft
Bukit Timah Monkey Man, a Singapore cryptid
Business Transaction Management, the practice of managing information technology
Mandailing language, ISO 639-3 code

See also
H&BTM, Huntingdon and Broad Top Mountain Railroad and Coal Company (reporting mark HBTM), Pennsylvania, Pittsburgh, USA